Dale Webster, known as "The Daily Wavester", is a surfer who lives in Valley Ford, California. He is best known for setting the official Guinness Book of World Records record for the "most consecutive days spent surfing" (14,641) and his appearance in Step into Liquid.

The record
For forty years, from September 3, 1975 to October 4, 2015, Dale caught at least three waves to shore at Bodega Bay (in Northern California), though most days, he caught many more. He did this every day, despite the danger and inconvenience of hurricane-force winds, shark infestations, car breakdowns, and kidney stone complications, making him the record-setter for the "most consecutive days spent surfing", at forty years. He also set the world record for most waves caught; forty three thousand nine hundred twenty three confirmed waves. He finally chose not to paddle out on October 5, 2015 when Webster, at 66 years, went in for a kidney stone operation. He had surfed every day for 40 years, one month and one day (14,641 days in a row).

According to Dale, he did this for a number of reasons: his wetsuit was damaged and he wanted to surf for a full year to force the manufacturer into replacing it (incorrectly interpreting the warranty) and that he attempted to beat what he thought was the record for the most consecutive days surfed (five thousand, two hundred and eighty), but was actually the record (in feet) for the longest distance surfed to shore.

Personal
While setting this record, Dale married his current wife, Kaye; raised his daughter, now a college student; and held several jobs. He went through thirty boards and twenty-eight wet suits. His daughter, Margo set a record of her own by being the first student in her school district to attend elementary through high school with perfect attendance.

In the media
Webster was described in an article in Surfer magazine under the title "The Daily Wavester", as well as in various other newspaper stories. He was featured in a four-minute scene in Dana Brown's 2003 surf movie Step into Liquid; a character in the movie is seen using a roll of stickers imprinted with the slogan "DALE WOULD GO". His narrow escape from a great white shark was described in an article in the local newspaper. Dale has finally been invited to the prestigious Surfer Poll Awards, in Hawaii, on December 6, 2015.

References

Year of birth missing (living people)
Living people
American surfers